Boghni is a town and commune in Tizi Ouzou Province in northern Algeria. It is located in the south of Tizi Ouzou, surrounded by Djurdjura mountain and surrounded by Maatekas, Beni Kouffi, Voughardane, Mechtras and other small communes. Boghni is known as the fourth most connected small village to Internet in the world.

References

Communes of Tizi Ouzou Province
Tizi Ouzou Province